The  is a commuter electric multiple unit (EMU) train type operated by the private railway operator Keisei Electric Railway in the Tokyo area of Japan since 1972.

Operations
The 3500 series sets operate on the Keisei Main Line. The eight-car sets were also used on Toei Asakusa Line and Keikyu line inter-running services until they were split into individual four-car sets in 2014, although the unrefurbished sets were not capable of operating on Keikyu lines.

Formations
Originally built as 24 four-car sets, the fleet was subsequently reformed into eight-, six-, and four-car sets.

, the fleet consists of 56 vehicles formed as four six-car sets and nine four-car sets.

6-car sets
The six-car sets are formed as shown below. All cars are motored.

The M1' cars are each fitted with one single-arm pantograph.

4-car sets
The four-car sets are formed as shown below. All cars are motored.

The M1' cars are each fitted with one single-arm pantograph.

8-car sets
Four eight-car sets were formed as shown below. All cars were motored.

The M1' cars are each fitted with one single-arm pantograph.

Interior

Seating consists of longitudinal bench seating throughout.

History
Major refurbishment of the fleet commenced in 1996, with a total of 56 vehicles refurbished by 2001. Refurbishment involved redesigned front ends with square lights instead of round and upgraded interiors.

Special farewell tours were staged for the last remaining unrefurbished 3500 series set, 3585, on 25 and 26 February 2017.

References

Keisei Electric Railway
Electric multiple units of Japan
Train-related introductions in 1972
Kawasaki multiple units
Nippon Sharyo multiple units
1500 V DC multiple units of Japan
Tokyu Car multiple units